The 2000 Blackpool Borough Council election took place on 4 May 2000 to elect members of Blackpool Borough Council in England. The whole council was up for election and the Labour Party stayed in overall control of the council.

Election Result

References

2000 English local elections
2000
2000s in Lancashire